The 2019 FINA Water Polo Challengers' Cup is an international water polo tournament held at the OCBC Aquatic Centre in Singapore from 8 to 13 October 2019. It is the seventh edition of the tournament which was known as the FINA World Water Polo Development Trophy until the 2017 edition. The tournament was hosted by the Singapore Swimming Association. Ten nations participated in the Challengers' Cup.

Singapore won over Austria in the final, with the host surpassing their second-place finish in 2009.

Groups

Preliminary round

Group A

Group B

Finals

9th place game

7th place game

5th place game

3rd place game

Gold medal match

Awards

 Most Valuable Player:  An Jun Ang
 Most Valuable Goalkeeper:  Salkan Samardzic
 Highest Goal-Scorer:  Ridjkie Mulia

Final standings

References

FINA Water Polo Challengers' Cup
Challenger's Cup
2019 in Singaporean sport
International sports competitions hosted by Singapore
FINA